Holy Ghost Revival was an American rock band formed in 2001 in Bainbridge Island, Washington. Self-described as "heavy metal/folk rock/pagan glam," the band had a rotating lineup of musicians. Before disbanding in 2008, the line-up included Conor Kiley (vocals, keyboard), Mikko Freeman (drums), Sebastian Sheldon (keyboard, guitar), Jakes Bayley (bass), and Johnny O'Donnell (guitar). They released a number of LPs and singles on labels such as 1965 Records.

The band drew on film soundtracks and 1970s and 1980s rock, and according to OC Weekly, "the Holy Ghost's vampy, swaggering power-chords-and-pianos set their glammy theatrics to operatic punk rock melodrama." Frontman Conor Kiley was described by Allmusic as "an unholy cross between Iggy Pop, Axl Rose, and Jim Morrison."

History

Founding
The metal band Holy Ghost Revival was founded on Bainbridge Island, Washington state in 2001. The band started when most of the members were still in highschool. According to frontman Conor Kiley, who graduated Bainbridge High School in 2001, "We were just high school kids that played punk rock music, glam rock and other groovy sounds. We just got together and started doing it." The name Holy Ghost Revival was taken from a shop sign in Seattle called The Blade, and the band got a van and began booking their own shows. Self-described as "heavy metal folk rock/pagan glam," the band has had a shifting lineup.  On Bainbridge Island, the band "served as mentors to the [local glam band] Gruff Mummies."

Releases
Early on the band released several singles and offered free 7" vinyl records to fans. They released City Drugs in 2005 as a vinyl LP on Antarctic Records.

Bleeding Light
Their debut album Bleeding Light was released in 2005 as a split release on the labels Jonny Cat and 17 Television, with Seattle musician Jherek Bischoff as a guest on strings. According to a positive review by CMJ, "As complex as Bleeding can get, the band is still basically a scroungy bunch that usually plays with scuzz-punk bands. The driving drums faithfully expose the blood and guts inside the goth body." Also in 2005, the band released the live album Live on Sycophanticide.  The musicians featured on this album were Conor Kiley (vocals), Sterling MacKinnon (bass), Andy Crane (keyboard), TV Coahran (guitar), and Mikko Freeman (drums).

1965 Records releases
Holy Ghost Revival signed with the London-based 1965 Records in 2007. Initially the label re-released the band's debut album Bleeding Light, and also in 2007 the band had two tracks included on the 1965 Records compilation Decline Of The Pacific Northwest - Seattle Rock N Roll Circa 2007. Released on 7" vinyl, the tracks featured Conor Kiley (vocals, keyboard), Mikko Freeman (drums), Jean-Paul Garnier (bass, clarinet, vocals), Sebastian Sheldon (keyboard, guitar), and Johnny O'Donnell (guitar).

Before February 2008 the band had toured Europe, and as of June 2008, had already completed several tours of the West coast and two tours of the United States. Later that month, they embarked on a larger tour supporting an album for the first time. Their single "Hot Love in a Berlin Bombshelter" was released in July 2008 on Burn Burn Burn Records, on 12" vinyl.

Twilight Exit (2008)

Later in 2008 the band moved into a Vauxhall-based council flat in London. There they worked on their sophomore album, which was produced by Ryan Hadlock (Modest Mouse). Twilight Exit, was released on September 1, 2008, again on 1965 Records. The album was inspired by horror film soundtracks.

NME gave Twilight Exit a score of 7/10, drawing connections to 1970s and 1980s rock bands such as Guns N' Roses and Jethro Tull, and stating "While on one side of Seattle Fleet Foxes are creating succulent Americana that smells of dew-flecked pine trees and freshly laundered plaid shirts, Holy Ghost Revival are on the other lobbing out star-spangled pop that, by the looks of them, you’d expect to reek of vomit, spontaneous street violence and pushing over grannies." About the sound, "Live, it’s a cacophony of sound, a fever that you can’t sweat out and a racket that your mum certainly would not approve of, but on record it’s contained, elegant retro-rock that mother might just give a spin."

Post dissolution
The band members split paths after the release of Twilight Exit and associated tour. Stated Kiley in 2010, the experience was "A lot of mayhem, ecstatic highs and dark, grisly lows. We ended up getting to do a bunch of awesome recordings, tour the world and somehow get on a major label and walk away unscathed. We called it a day at the right time."

By 2010, Kiley was performing with the group Broken Nobles, and since has been releasing music under the name Bad Blood.

Style
The Seattle Weekly called the band "a Seattle wild card who crash Victoriana whimsy into metal anthems." About the band's message, Kiley has stated, "I guess it has no redeeming social value like any good rock n’ roll music. It’s fuelled by apathy and hatred and all of the things teenagers have right now which is basically nothing." James Monger of Allmusic called frontman Kiley "an unholy cross between Iggy Pop, Axl Rose, and Jim Morrison."

The band cites The Scorpions and The Doors as influences, as well as Diamond Dogs, David Bowie, Blue Öyster Cult, and movie soundtracks. They specifically cite Stanley Kubrick's films an influence, and many of their songs are ostensibly written for film. According to OC Weekly, "the Holy Ghost's vampy, swaggering power-chords-and-pianos set—their glammy theatrics and operatic punk rock melodrama—are easy to cast: Theda Barra meets Marc Bolan meets Robert Smith. [Music critic] Richard Meltzer consulted on the script."

Members
Past primary members
Conor Kiley - Vocals, Keyboard, Guitar
Mikko Freeman - Drums
Sterling MacKinnon - Bass
TV Coahran - Guitar
Andy Crane - Keyboard
Paul Phillip Brinkley - Guitar
Jean-Paul Garrnier - Bass and Clarinet
Sebastian Sheldon -Keyboard and Guitar
Johnny O'Donnell - Guitar
Jakes Bayley - Bass
 Jeremy Young - Drums
 Chad Dahlquist - Keyboard
 Vanessa Gonzalez - Keyboard
 Morgan Stickrod - Guitar
 Zack Lewis - Guitar

Past guest artists
Jherek Bischoff  - Strings

Discography

Albums

Singles

Compilations
2006: NME Presents - Independent Thinking (1965 Records) - track "Christmas Everyday"
2007: Decline Of The Pacific Northwest - Seattle Rock N Roll Circa 2007 (1965 Records) - tracks "Girl's Night Out" and "Angel Of Death Of My Dreams Part 2"
2007: Ponies In A Stable (Don't Stop Believin' Records) - track "Lay Me Down"
2009: GGNZLA Sampler (GGNZLA) - track "It's Ok To Be Gay"

Further reading
Holy Ghost Revival Tour Diary, 2008
Interviews, articles

Discographies
Holy Ghost Revival at Allmusic
Holy Ghost Revival at Discogs

See also
Glam rock

References 

Rock music groups from Washington (state)
Musical groups established in 2001
Musical groups disestablished in 2008